Anne Woods Patterson (born 1949) is an American diplomat and career Foreign Service Officer. She served as the Assistant Secretary of State for Near Eastern Affairs from 2013 to 2017. She previously served as United States Ambassador to Egypt until 2013 and as United States Ambassador to Pakistan from July 2007 to October 2010.

Early life and education
Patterson was born in Fort Smith, Arkansas. She attended The Hockaday School in Dallas, Texas. She received her bachelor's degree from Wellesley College and attended graduate school at the University of North Carolina at Chapel Hill for one year.

Career
Patterson entered the Foreign Service in 1973.

She served as a U.S. State Department Economic Officer and Counselor to Saudi Arabia from 1984 to 1988 and then as a Political Counselor at the United States Mission to the United Nations in Geneva from 1988 to 1991.

Patterson served as State Department Director for the Andean Countries from 1991 to 1993. She served as Deputy Assistant Secretary for Inter-American Affairs from 1993 to 1996.

Patterson served as United States Ambassador to El Salvador from 1997 to 2000, and then as United States Ambassador to Colombia from 2000 to 2003. While ambassador to Colombia, Patterson and U.S. Senator Paul Wellstone were the alleged targets of a failed bomb plot while on an official visit to the Colombian town of Barrancabermeja. From 2003 to 2004 Patterson served as Deputy Inspector General of the US State Department.

In August 2004, Patterson was appointed Deputy U.S. Permanent Representative to the United Nations. Patterson became acting Permanent Representative to the United Nations after John Danforth resigned, effective January 20, 2005. An extended delay in the confirmation of John R. Bolton by the Senate (ending when Bolton assumed the position on August 1, 2005, after a recess appointment) caused Patterson to serve as interim permanent representative longer than expected.

Patterson became Assistant Secretary of State for International Narcotics and Law Enforcement Affairs on November 28, 2005, serving until May 2007. President George W. Bush appointed Patterson as the United States Ambassador to Pakistan after Ryan Crocker left that post to become Ambassador to Iraq. She served in Pakistan between July 2007 and October 2010.

In May 2011 U.S. President Obama nominated Patterson to be the U.S. Ambassador to Egypt. On June 30, 2011, the United States Senate confirmed Patterson by unanimous consent to be the United States Ambassador to Egypt.

During the protests that ousted Egyptian president Mohamed Morsi from power on July 3, 2013, Patterson was singled out specially by the protesters for being too close to Morsi and the Muslim Brotherhood.

On August 1, 2013, Patterson was nominated to serve as the assistant secretary of state in the State Department's Bureau of Near Eastern Affairs, which oversees the Middle East. The U.S. Senate confirmed Robert S. Beecroft to succeed her as ambassador to Egypt on June 26, 2014.

Patterson was considered for Defense Undersecretary for Policy under James Mattis; however, she was withdrawn after opposition from Tom Cotton, senator from Arkansas. Speculation was that Cotton favors a harshly anti-Muslim Brotherhood policy and Patterson's time as Ambassador to Egypt under President Morsi disqualified her in his eyes.

Patterson currently serves on the commission on the National Defense Strategy for the United States and as the Kissinger Senior Fellow at the Yale University Jackson Institute for Global Affairs.

Patterson served a stint as President of the US-Qatar Business Council.

Personal life
Patterson is married to David R. Patterson, a retired Foreign Service officer. The couple have two children.

References

External links

|-

|-

|-

|-

|-

|-

1949 births
Ambassadors of the United States to Colombia
Ambassadors of the United States to Egypt
Ambassadors of the United States to El Salvador
Ambassadors of the United States to Pakistan
American women ambassadors
Assistant Secretaries of State for the Near East and North Africa
Living people
People from Fort Smith, Arkansas
Permanent Representatives of the United States to the United Nations
United States Assistant Secretaries of State
United States Career Ambassadors
University of North Carolina at Chapel Hill alumni
Wellesley College alumni
Hockaday School alumni
United States Foreign Service personnel